Comet 87P/Bus is a periodic comet with an orbital period of 6.5 years. It fits the definition of an Encke-type comet with (TJupiter > 3; a < aJupiter). It was discovered by Schelte J. Bus in 1981 on a plate taken with the 1.2m UK Schmidt telescope at Siding Spring, Australia. The discovery was announced in IAU Circular 3578 on March 4, 1981.

It has been observed on each of its subsequent apparitions, most recently in 2020.

References 
 

 IAUC 3578

External links 
 Orbital simulation from JPL (Java) / Horizons Ephemeris
 87P/Bus – Seiichi Yoshida @ aerith.net

Periodic comets
0087
Encke-type comets
Discoveries by Schelte J. Bus
Comets in 2013
Astronomical objects discovered in 1981